Hanazakarino Kimitachihe, is a 2006 Taiwanese drama starring Ella Chen of S.H.E, Wu Chun and Jiro Wang of Fahrenheit, and Danson Tang. It was based on Japanese shōjo manga series Hana-Kimi by Hisaya Nakajo.

The series was first broadcast in Taiwan on free-to-air Chinese Television System (CTS) (華視) from 19 November 2006 to 4 March 2007, every Sunday at 21:30 and cable TV Gala Television (GTV) Variety Show/CH 28 (八大綜合台) on 25 November 2006, every Saturday at 21:00.

Hanazakarino Kimitachihe was nominated for Best Marketing Programme of the Year at the 42nd Golden Bell Awards in 2007.

Production
The series is the first live-action television adaptation of the manga, followed by the Japanese version Hanazakari no Kimitachi e, starring Shun Oguri as Izumi Sano, Maki Horikita as Mizuki Ashiya, and Toma Ikuta as Shuichi Nakatsu, broadcast on Fuji Television in 2007; its remake Hanazakari no Kimitachi e 2011; and the South Korean adaptation To the Beautiful You in 2012.

This drama was produced by Comic Productions (可米製作股份有限公司) and directed by Mingtai Wang (王明台). It was filmed on location at National Chi Nan University in Puli, Nantou County.

Although the original manga's Japanese title means For You in Full Blossom, the Chinese title means "The tricks of boys and girls," referring to student life within the drama. The official Roman-character name of the drama series is an alternative romanization of the manga's Japanese title (the Hepburn romanization of the same title is Hanazakari no Kimitachi e). The drama's Chinese title is also the name used in the Chinese translation of the manga by Tong Li Publishing.

Synopsis
In America, Lu Rui Xi (Ella Chen) watches a documentary on Taiwanese high jumper Zuo Yi Quan (Wu Chun). Inspired by his jumps, Rui Xi decides that she wants to meet her idol and therefore transfers to Ying Kai University which he attends in Taiwan. However, the school is an all-boys school and thus Rui Xi cuts all her hair off and dresses up as a boy in order to attend the school. There she befriends Jin Xiu Yi (Jiro Wang). During a friendly soccer match between the two, Rui Xi gets knocks unconscious and so Quan aids by taking her to the school's doctor, Mei Tian. Mei Tian, being gay, detects that Rui Xi is a girl. As Quan grabs Rui Xi to carry her to the sick bay, he also discovers that she is in fact a girl. He keeps her identity a secret from everyone, including Rui Xi. Unbeknown to Rui Xi, before her arrival Quan had given up high jumping after a road accident whilst trying to save his high school friend from being run over. Their relationship begins to blossom when Rui Xi convinces Quan to return to high jumping.

Many events passed, including a visit by Rui Xi's half brother Lu Jing Xi (JJ Lin), who threatens to take Rui Xi back to America, their summer break working at a vacation house, owned by Mei Tian's sister, since Dorm 2 needed some construction done, the school's festival where the three dormitories compete with each other in various games and Rui Xi being entered into the beauty pageant and a school trip to hot springs resort to Quan's home town, where Rui Xi helps Quan to deal with his family. Meanwhile, Rui Xi's manliness cannot pass Xiu Yi's girl radar and so Xiu Yi begins to develop feelings for Rui Xi. However, since Xiu Yi is unaware that Rui Xi is a girl, he begins to question his own sexuality. He even announced to the whole school that he is, in fact, gay.

In the end, Rui Xi was talking to herself inside her and Quan's room thinking about the past two years she spent with Quan, Xiu Yi and the others. Eventually, she thought about leaving Ying Kai secretly, but unbeknownst to Rui Xi, Quan was quietly listening to every word she was saying. Thus, Quan gathered up their group to stop Rui Xi from leaving, reasoning that Rui Xi has gone back to America to have a double eyelid surgery to stop his comrades from asking her secret.

Episode 1: Lu Rui Xi from America decided to go to Taiwan and go to Ying Kai university which is a boy school for her idol. Lu Rui Xi chops all her hair off and wears boy clothes to look like a boy to be admitted to an all boys school to be with Zuo Yi Quan, a high jumper she admires. After being admitted to the school, Rui Xi makes friends with Jin Xiu Yi and even becomes roommates with Quan! Xiu Yi is a soccer prodigy and wanted to play a game with Rui Xi and Xiu Ti accidentally hit Rui Xi it the head leading her to faint. When Xiu Yi went to get gelp, Quan decided to take Rui Xi to the doctors office but while picking her up he finds out something unusual for a guy to have, breasts! Ge finds out Rui Xis secret and also the gay doctor (Dr. Mei Tian).

Episode 2:Jin Xiy Yi questions his sexuality because he likes Rui Xi. Rui Xi begins to annoy Quan about high jumping. Later Quan made her cry and Xiu Yi sees her. It made Xiu Yi angry at Quan so he went to confront him

Episode 3: Shen Le is another high jumper but is more talented at it than Quan. Rui Xi and Shen Le build up hatred for each other after roasting each other at a soccer game. Rui Ci often goes to the gay doctor's office for life advice since they both know about her secret. Quan iver hears Rui xi talking to Yu Ci Lang (Quan's dog) about her personal life and Quan hears about it and starts to like her.

Episode 4: Rui Xi starts receiving hate notes from Le Cheng Yang (Yang Yang) and is secretly sad/mad. Rui Xi's became instantly harder after she received a letter from he half brother saying that he is coming the next day. The terrible thing us that her brother doesn't know she attends a boy school. Quan starts being cautious of Rui Xi and is spying on what she was doing and found she was just seeing her brother. After finding out who made hate notes, Rui Xi had a talk with Yang Yang and made friends. But moments after talking to him, her brother who is staying in Taiwan for two weeks, saw her dressed up and walking around campus and found out everything. He would let Rui Xi stay under one condition, within the two weeks he's staying, Quan needs to high jump like he used to.

Characters
Most characters in the series have names which are close approximations of the Chinese transliterations of the names found in the original manga.

Major characters

Minor characters

Soundtrack

The Hanazakarino Kimitachihe Original Soundtrack was released on 1 December 2006 by HIM International Music.

ReceptionHua Yang Shao Nian Shao Nus pilot episode started off strong, posting a rating of 3.05 The show encountered little competition until the premiere of Show Lo and Barbie Shu's Corner With Love. Before Corner With Loves pilot episode was aired, Hsu bet that Corners highest rating would hover around 2.9, while Chai Zhiping bet on ratings of around 3.3. Corner would end up posting a final average of 2.81, with a peak at around 3.25, but it was no match for Hua Yang Shao Nian Shao Nus average rating of 3.91 that week. The Corner With Love threat would be held off for yet another episode, as Hua Yang Shao Nian Shao Nus 8th episode posted ratings of 3.88, compared to Corners 3.17 - a difference of nearly 150,000 viewers per minute. As both series fought for viewership, Hanazakarino never relinquished its weekly ratings crown. By the 12th episode, the series had already cracked 5.0. The final episode achieved a rating of 5.98. The ratings for Hua Yang Shao Nian Shao Nu were so high that television channels in Japan and South Korea dished out over 30,000,000 NTD for the rights to broadcast the drama. The drama's ratings performance resulted in a nomination at the 2007 Seoul International Drama Awards in the Best Juvenile Drama category. Gala Television had originally placed Hua Yang Shao Nian Shao Nu in the Best Drama Series category, alongside Beijing dramas Tang Dynasty and The Great Revival, but changed their mind at the last minute. Following the drama's 15-episode run, media sources speculated that Ella, Wu and Wang will all sign on to star in the drama's sequel. In September 2007, Producer Huang Wang Bo officially denied this claim.

The single episode ratings are as follows:

Special episode: 5.98% 

International broadcast
The show was later re-broadcast on Singapore's Channel U as well as Hong Kong's TVB network. 
 Malaysia - May 24, 2007 - channel 8TV
 Canada - August 3, 2007 - Talentvision
 Philippines - March 24-May 30, 2008; re-broadcast - June 7 at 10 am - ABS-CBN 2. In 2013, it was re-broadcast again in a Filipino cable channel Fox Filipino. 
 In Indonesia, the series was broadcast by Indosiar in June to August 2011.

Trivia
One of Wu Chun's other dramas, Tokyo Juliet, was mentioned by Rui Xi. Quan denied that he ever watched the show.
Rui Xi was watching It Started with a Kiss'' at one of the scenes.
Senior Nan always makes the comment, "What do you think I'm filming an Idol Series?"
Occasionally, songs from boyband Fahrenheit (Taiwanese band) were played in the dormitory.
Jin Xui Yi (Jiro Wang) and Zuo Yi Quan (Wu Chun) are in the same boy band (Fahrenheit)

PersonnelProducer: Gao Wu SongDirector: Niu Cheng Ze / Wang Ming TaiScreenwriter:''' Qi Xi Lin

References

External links
  CTS Hanazakarino Kimitachihe official homepage
  GTV Hanazakarino Kimitachihe official homepage

Chinese Television System original programming
Gala Television original programming
2006 Taiwanese television series debuts
2007 Taiwanese television series endings
Taiwanese television dramas based on manga
Taiwanese LGBT-related television shows